Feuquières may refer to:

Persons 
Isaac Manasses de Pas, Marquis de Feuquieres (1590–1640), a French diplomat
Antoine de Pas de Feuquieres (1648–1711), a French soldier
Philibert-Charles de Pas de Feuquières, Bishop of Agde, 1702–1726

Places
Feuquières Lake, Quebec, Canada
Feuquières, Oise, a commune in the department of Oise, France
Feuquières-en-Vimeu, a commune in the department of Somme, France